The list of ship decommissionings in 1964 includes a chronological list of all ships decommissioned in 1964.


See also 

1964
 
Ship